Antitype armena is a moth of the family Noctuidae. It is found in Armenia.

Antitype (moth)